Im toten Winkel - Hitlers Sekretärin (titled Blind Spot: Hitler's Secretary in English) is a 2002 Austrian documentary directed by André Heller and Othmar Schmiderer.

Description 
Blind Spot is a 90-minute interview of Traudl Junge, the last personal secretary of the Third Reich dictator Adolf Hitler. Urged to tell her story by her friend, Austrian author Melissa Müller, Junge agreed to make a documentary with André Heller, an Austrian director and artist with Jewish family members who died in Nazi death camps. Two excerpts of this work, including the introduction and conclusion, are featured in the movie Der Untergang, which itself is partly based on Until the Final Hour, Junge's memoirs about her experiences with Hitler, written in 1947, but not published till 2002.

See also 
List of German language films
The World at War, a 1974 British television documentary series featuring an interview with Junge in the episode "Inside the Reich: Germany (1940–1944)."

References

External links 
Official site

2000s German-language films
2002 films
Austrian documentary films
Documentary films about the Holocaust
Documentary films about Adolf Hitler
2002 documentary films
Sony Pictures Classics films